The Indiana Department of Natural Resources (DNR) is the agency of the U.S. state of Indiana. There are many divisions within the DNR and each has a specific role. The DNR is not only responsible for maintaining resource areas but also manages Indiana's fish and wildlife, reclaims coal mine ground, manages forested areas, aids in the management of wildlife on private lands, enforces Indiana's conservation laws, and many other duties not named here. According to the department's website, their mission is "to protect, enhance, preserve, and wisely use natural, cultural, and recreational resources for the benefit of Indiana's citizens through professional leadership, management, and education".

History 

The Department of Natural Resources was created as part of the Natural Resources Act, passed by the Indiana General Assembly and signed into law by Governor Roger Branigin in 1965.

Four agencies were placed under the department's umbrella:

 Department of Conservation (the forerunner to the Department of Natural Resources)
 Flood Control and Water Resources Commission
 State Soil and Water Conservation Committee
 Outdoor Recreation Council

In 1967, the Nature Preserves Act established the Division of Nature Preserves, also under the same departmental oversight. Since then, the department has been involved in numerous initiatives and legislative efforts, including the establishment of new state parks, new flood laws, hunter safety programs, forestry education, and the general rejuvenation of Indiana's forestland. Today, the Department of Natural Resources claims that Indiana has 4.5 million acres (18,000 km²) of forestland, still far from the area's original 23 million acres (93,000 km²), but an improvement from the two million acres (8,000 km²) that remained intact by 1900.

Organization 

At the top of the organization is the director (presently Dan Bortner), who reports directly to the Governor of Indiana. In addition to overseeing the department, the director also serves on an autonomous board known as the Natural Resources Commission, consisting of both government officials and citizen members, which meets at least four times annually to address issues pertaining to the department. The director also has an advisory council at his disposal.

Beneath the director, there are four deputy directors, each of whom is responsible for a team under which many of the department's divisions are organized. Those teams and their divisions are as follows:

 Regulatory Management Team
 Water
 Reclamation
 Entomology & Plant Pathology
 Historic Preservation & Archaeology
 Oil and Gas
 Land Management Team
 State Parks & Reservoirs
 Natural Preserves
 Land Acquisition
 Fish and Wildlife
 Outdoor Recreation
 Forestry
 Engineering
 Administrative Management Team
 Budget and Performance Management
 Accounting
 Human Resources
 MIS
 Purchasing
 Strategic Management & Organizational Excellence
 Legal Team
 Office of Legal Counsel

In addition, there are five departments that do not fall under one of the four teams:

 Legislative Affairs
 Communications
 Law Enforcement
 Natural Resources Foundation
 Indiana Heritage Trust

The agency's official magazine is Outdoor Indiana.

See also
 Indiana Department of Natural Resources Law Enforcement Division
 List of Indiana fish and wildlife areas
 List of Indiana state forests
 List of Indiana state lakes
 List of Indiana state parks
 List of State Fish and Wildlife Management Agencies in the U.S.

References

External links 

 Outdoor Indiana magazine
 Official Indiana DNR Hunting Regulations
 Official Indiana DNR Freshwater Fishing Regulations

Natural Resources
State environmental protection agencies of the United States
Natural resources agencies in the United States
1965 establishments in Indiana